The East Branch Pleasant River is a  tributary of the Piscataquis River in Piscataquis County, Maine.

The Appalachian Trail crosses the East Branch in T.A R.11 WELS.

See also
List of rivers of Maine

References

Maine Streamflow Data from the USGS
Maine Watershed Data From Environmental Protection Agency

Tributaries of the Penobscot River
Rivers of Piscataquis County, Maine
Rivers of Maine